Renita Maree Farrell-Garard  (born 30 May 1972 in Townsville, Queensland) is a former field hockey player from Australia, who was a member of the Australian Women’s Hockey Team, best known as the Hockeyroos, that won the gold medals at the 1996 and the 2000 Summer Olympics. She made her international debut in 1994, and co-captained the winning Atlanta side.

She is married to Gerry Garard, father of Brendan Garard, a field hockey player who claimed the bronze medal at the men's competition in Atlanta, Georgia.

Farrell was awarded the Medal of the Order of Australia (OAM) in the 1997 Australia Day Honours and the Australian Sports Medal in June 2000.

References

 Australian Olympic Committee

External links
 
 
 
 
 
 

1972 births
Living people
Australian female field hockey players
Olympic field hockey players of Australia
Olympic gold medalists for Australia
Olympic medalists in field hockey
Field hockey players at the 1996 Summer Olympics
Field hockey players at the 2000 Summer Olympics
Medalists at the 1996 Summer Olympics
Medalists at the 2000 Summer Olympics
Sportspeople from Townsville
Members of the Order of Australia
Recipients of the Australian Sports Medal